Mastrangelo may refer to:

People
Adriano Mastrangelo (1919–1999), former Republican member of the Pennsylvania House of Representatives
Alana Mastrangelo (born 1988), American journalist
Bobbi Mastrangelo (born 1937), American artist
Carlo Mastrangelo (1937–2016), American doo-wop and progressive rock singer
Ernesto Mastrángelo (born 1948), Argentine football striker 
Fernando Mastrangelo (born 1978), Brooklyn-based contemporary artist
John Mastrangelo (1926–1987), American football player in the National Football League
Luigi Mastrangelo (born 1975), Italian men's volleyball player

Other
Il giudice Mastrangelo, an Italian crime-comedy television series